Dagsrevyen (English: The Daily Review) is the daily evening news programme for the Norwegian television channel NRK1, the main channel of the Norwegian Broadcasting Corporation (NRK), broadcast at 19:00. In 2007, the programme started airing simultaneously on NRK's dedicated news channel NRK2, but this arrangement ended that same year. Dagsrevyen's first newscast was broadcast in 1958 and it has kept its name since. It is Norway's most viewed programme, with daily ratings of around one million. Around 200 people are involved in its production, with headquarters at Marienlyst in Oslo.

Dagsrevyen aims at fewer, but longer and more extensive stories than its competitors. NRK hosts a tight network of domestic journalists in addition to international correspondence offices, though NRK also uses footage acquired through the European Broadcasting Union. The show is hosted by two anchors. The Saturday and Sunday broadcasts are dubbed Lørdagsrevyen (The Saturday Review) and Søndagsrevyen (The Sunday Review), respectively.

The editor of television news is Solveig Tvedt and the lead news editor is Stein Bjøntegård.

Other news-related broadcasts on NRK include Dagsrevyen 21, Kveldsnytt, Standpunkt (closed down), RedaksjonEN, Urix and Dagsnytt, plus the radio shows Ukeslutt, Dagsnytt 18 and Her og Nå. NRK also broadcasts daily newscasts from most regional offices.

References

External links 
 Dagsrevyen Archives NRK 
 

1958 Norwegian television series debuts
1950s Norwegian television series
1960s Norwegian television series
1970s Norwegian television series
1980s Norwegian television series
1990s Norwegian television series
2000s Norwegian television series
2010s Norwegian television series
2020s Norwegian television series
1958 establishments in Norway
NRK original programming